The šargija, anglicized as shargia, is a plucked, fretted long necked lute used in the folk music of various Balkan countries, including Bosnia and Herzegovina, Serbia, Croatia, Albania, North Macedonia and Kosovo. The instrument is part of a larger family of instruments which includes the Balkan tambura and the bağlama (or tambura saz), tamburica, and the tambouras.

History
The instrument was studied by musicologists in the 20th century. Their studies have been characterized as speculative and nationalistic.

More recently, an American researcher, Richard March, concluded that the tambura arrived in the Balkans with Turkish people in the 1500s. It was adopted by people living in the Balkans, including "urban Muslim Slavs" and "Bosnia Christians." It also arrived in Croatia with laborers.

Today the šargija is played by Albanians, Bosniaks, Serbs and Croats. The sharki is used by the Gheg Albanians in northern Albania, Kosovo, and parts of Montenegro and North Macedonia.

The Instrument accompanies singing and dancing.

Characteristics

Its original four strings have been increased to six or even seven. These are grouped to create courses of strings; the instrument has 3 or 4 courses. In the past, frets were moveable, although generally not moved once the instrument was set up. Modern instruments may be inlaid with non-moveable metal frets.

The pattern that the frets are set up to play depends on the tonal system used by the musical tradition a musician participate in.  The instrument's body can be made from separate staves, or carved from one piece of wood.

The šargija usually accompanies the violin, and has a jangling quality, similar to the Turkish saz. Musician's play with "complex polyphonic techniques".

The sharki is a similar to or related to the two-string Çifteli or qiftelia, but with more strings.

Sources

Additional works which discuss the instrument
Atlas of Plucked Instruments
JazzStudied Website — San Diego State University

External links
Video of a Šargija being played.

Necked bowl lutes
Bosniak culture
Bosnian musical instruments
Albanian musical instruments
Croatian musical instruments
Serbian musical instruments